Prakāśa is a concept of Kashmir Shaivism translated by various authors as "light", "splendour", "light of consciousness" (identified with Śiva) (Swami Lakshman Joo), "luminous and undifferentiated consciousness" (Paul E. Murphy) or "primordial light beyond all manifestations" (Paul Muller-Ortega). Fellow Tantric practitioners Tibetan Buddhists practice Clear Light yoga based on a similar concept.

Prakāśa is considered supreme, ultimate, unsurpassable, but as such it cannot be described as pure transcendence, because even though it is above all, it is still present in the manifestation, in every aspect of it. Thus prakāśa is said to be both transcendent and immanent.

The prakāśa-vimarśa couple
Uncreated light (prakāśa) is the essence of Śiva. Its function is to illuminate, to make manifest. However, Kashmir Shaivism declares that the nature of prakāśa is "self apprehension", or, to reflect upon itself. "If the supreme light were devoid of this free and spontaneous self-referential capacity, it would be powerless and inert".Prakāśa and vimarśa form a couple at the supreme level, identified respectively with Śiva and Śakti.

Related terms and synonyms
Kashmir Shaivism accords a very important role to the concept of consciousness as light, so, repeatedly trying to describe this essentially undescribable experience, has given it a plurality of names:
 sphurattā - twinkling, spark
 ābhāsa - splendour, light, appearance, shining forth
 pratibhā - to shine upon, become clear or manifest, intuition
  - glittering, sparkling
 ullāsa - light, splendour, bright

Subjective experiences of prakāśa
There is no way a personal experience of prakāśa could be fully conveyed into words, but mystics, both ancient and modern, have tried to do so, because such words carry a powerful spiritual charge. Some of the subjective attributes of the light of consciousness, in synthesis, are: "liquid", "blissful", "immaculate", "blinding", "enveloping" and "weightless". Here are but a few of the many accounts:

Gopi Krishna
Gopi Krishna, in his first experience of the awakening of kundalini has experienced luminous manifestations he described as:
 "a halo of light",
 "a stream of liquid light",
 "waves of light" and
 "a sea of light"

Jaideva Singh
In his translation of Pratyabhijnahridayam uses such formulations :
 about consciousness : "the perfect I-consciousness is full of light and bliss"
 about the spiritual heart : " is not the physical heart. It had been called  because it is the center of reality. It is the light of consciousness."
 the world as seen from the perspective of the liberated being - "the world no longer appears as mere earth, but as clothed in celestial light".

Ramakrishna
A mystical experience of Ramakrishna, representing a turning point for him :
 "Everything vanished, as if there was nothing anywhere! And what was that I saw? A boundless, endless, conscious ocean of light;...; brilliant rows of waves were roaring towards me"

Yogananda
A few accounts of encounters with the uncreated light, by Yogananda :
 "I saw a blinding light, enveloping my body and the entire room"
 "a fluid piercing light streaming from every pore;...; my sense of identity was no longer confined to a body but embraced the circumambient atoms"
 "I gazed at my arms and moved them back and forth, yet could not feel their weight; ecstatic joy overwhelmed me... the illusion of a solid body was completely dissipated, as my realization deepened that the essence of all things is light"

Here are some quotes referring to the light of consciousness :
 Parameśvara ... "blindingly shining in eternity"
 Śañkara ... "infinite light whose essence is the pure ambrosia"
 Śiva ... "you are the white-shining essence, origin of every intention, unchanged in each reincarnation"

Abhinavagupta
A few selective quotes from Tantraloka of Abhinavagupta:
 "By the means of the splendid light that shines in the immaculate heart, one obtains union with Śiva"
 "The yogi who has had the experience of the great light enters into the condition of being of the nature of Śiva"
 "The consciousness is formed of light and beatitude"

Notes

Kashmir Shaivism
Hindu philosophical concepts
Spiritual faculties
Hindu tantra
Tantric practices